The Southwest Stakes is a Grade III American Thoroughbred horse race for three-year-old horses at a distance of one and one-sixteenth miles on the dirt run annually in late January at Oaklawn Park Race Track in Hot Springs, Arkansas.  The event currently offers a purse of $750,000.

History
The inaugural running of the event was on 2 March 1968 as the Southwest Handicap over a distance of six furlongs and was won by Robert E. Lehmann's Mr. Crozy by  lengths in a fast time on 1:10.

Oaklawn Park acknowledges that prior to 1968 there existed an event known as the Southwest Purse, however these events are not considered in the official counts of the renewal of this event. The event that was run on 24 March 1959 was a claiming event for four-year-olds and older while the event run on 17 February 1962 was held on opening day of the race meet and over a distance of  furlongs for three year olds.

The Southwest Handicap was increased to one mile in 1983.

The conditions of the event were changed from a handicap to a stakes race with allowances in 1985 with a rename of the race to Southwest Stakes. Originally ungraded, the Southwest Stakes was upgraded to a Grade III event in 2008 by the American Graded Stakes Committee.

The distance was increased to  miles in 2013.

The event has been held in split divisions in 1972, 2002, and 2012.

The 1984 winner Whitebrush set a new track record for the mile distance which still stands at Oaklawn Park.

The race is often used as a prep to the Rebel Stakes and Arkansas Derby, and is part of the Road to the Kentucky Derby. Among the horses who have used the Southwest as a springboard to the Triple Crown series are Lil E. Tee (won 1992 Kentucky Derby after finishing third in the 1992 Southwest), Pine Bluff (won Preakness after being second in the 1992 Southwest) and Smarty Jones (won the Southwest, Kentucky Derby and Preakness in 2004).

Since 2013 the event has been part of the Road to the Kentucky Derby.

For many years the event was usually held during the President's Day weekend but was moved to late January after Oaklawn Park introduced a new schedule of their expanded program for the 2021–22 racing season.

Records
Speed  record:
 miles – 1:41.83 One Liner (2017)
1 mile – 1:34.40 Whitebrush  (1984) Track Record
6 furlongs  – 1:10.40  Mr. Crozy (1968)

Margins:
 12 lengths   –	Tarascon (1990)

Most wins by a jockey:
 3 - Larry Snyder (1979, 1983, 1990)
 3 - Rafael Bejarano (2012 - both divisions, 2013)
 3 - John R. Velazquez (2017, 2022, 2023)

Most wins by a trainer:
 6 - Bob Baffert (2010, 2012 - both divisions, 2013, 2022, 2023)

Most wins by an owner:
 3 - Loblolly Stable (1984, 1987, 1991)

Winners

Notes:

§ Ran as an entry

† The running of the event on 24 March 1959 was a claiming event for four-year-olds and older. The winner Call Hy was a five year old.

See also
List of American and Canadian Graded races

External links
 Oaklawn Park Media Guide 2020

References

1968 establishments in Arkansas
Horse races in Arkansas
Oaklawn Park
Flat horse races for three-year-olds
Triple Crown Prep Races
Graded stakes races in the United States
Recurring sporting events established in 1968
Grade 3 stakes races in the United States